Mullingar RFC is an Irish rugby team based in Mullingar, County Westmeath, playing in Men's Division 2A of the Leinster League and Women's Leinster Division 2A. Thomas Cambell is the Senior Men's J1 Coach & Niall Kane Head Coach of the Senior Women. The club is flourishing in Ireland with 3 Adult teams, a very Strong Youths Section & thriving Mini's. We have some of the best facilities including the latest synthetic surfaces for playing and training available today. Our grounds are located at Shay Murtagh Park, Cullion, Mullingar, Co. Westmeath. Main Club Sponsors are Newbrook Group, & Shay Murtagh. Our official online social media is Facebook as Mullingar Rugby Club & Mullingar Women's & Girls Rugby - Heifers Rugby and our Twitter accounts @mullingar_rfc & @mullingarheifs
The Club Colours are Scarlet & Dove grey jerseys, navy shorts and red socks.

References
 

Rugby clubs established in 1924
Rugby union clubs in County Westmeath
Mullingar